Aloysius Joseph Connor (April 13, 1895 – December 18, 1967) was a United States district judge of the United States District Court for the District of New Hampshire.

Education and career

Born in Manchester, New Hampshire, Connor received a Bachelor of Laws from the Columbus School of Law at the Catholic University of America in 1918. He was in private practice in Manchester from 1919 to 1937, serving as county treasurer of Hillsborough County, New Hampshire from 1923 to 1924, and as city solicitor for Manchester from 1935 to 1936. He was a Judge of the Superior Court of New Hampshire from 1937 to 1945.

Federal judicial service

On November 16, 1944, Connor was nominated by President Franklin D. Roosevelt to a seat on the United States District Court for the District of New Hampshire vacated by Judge George Franklin Morris. Connor was confirmed by the United States Senate on December 5, 1944, and received his commission on December 9, 1944, serving thereafter until his death on December 18, 1967.

References

Sources
 

1895 births
1967 deaths
Columbus School of Law alumni
New Hampshire state court judges
Judges of the United States District Court for the District of New Hampshire
United States district court judges appointed by Franklin D. Roosevelt
20th-century American judges